Chris Kramer (born 1988) is an  American basketball player.

Chris Kramer may also refer to:

Chris Kramer (actor) (born 1975), Canadian actor

See also
Christina Kramer, language professor
Chris Cramer (disambiguation)